

General  Adolf-Friedrich Kuntzen  (26 July 1889 – 10 July 1964) was a German general in the Wehrmacht during World War II who commanded the LXXXI Army-Corps under Erwin Rommel in Normandy in 1944.

He saw service in World War I, and served in a variety of positions in the interwar period. Promoted to Generalmajor in 1938, he assumed command of the 3rd Light Division on 10 November 1938. This unit was reorganized as the 8th Panzer Division in 1939 and Kuntzen led the division in Poland and France. On 15 March 1941 he was appointed to command the LVII Panzer Corps, which he led in Russia until 1942.

Awards
 Knight's Cross of the Iron Cross on 3 June 1940 as Generalleutnant and commander of 8th Panzer Division

References

Citations

Bibliography

 

1889 births
1964 deaths
Military personnel from Magdeburg
Generals of Panzer Troops
German Army personnel of World War I
Recipients of the clasp to the Iron Cross, 1st class
Recipients of the Knight's Cross of the Iron Cross
People from the Province of Saxony
Reichswehr personnel
German Army generals of World War II